Ann Lomas Loades,  ( Glover; 21 September 1938 – 6 December 2022) was a British theologian and academic, who specialised in Christian feminism. 

Glover graduated from Durham University in 1960 with a Bachelor of Arts (BA) degree; she was a member of St Mary's College. She spent all her academic career at Durham, beginning as a lecturer in theology in 1975 and she held a personal chair as Professor of Divinity from 1995 to 2003. Following retirement, she was an emeritus professor at Durham University and, from 2009, an honorary professor at the University of St Andrews. She was also editor of the Theology journal from 1991 to 1997, and president of the Society for the Study of Theology from 2005 to 2006.

In the 2001 New Year Honours, Loades was appointed a Commander of the Order of the British Empire (CBE) for served to theology. In 2008, a Festschrift was published in her honour titled "Exchanges of Grace: Essays in Honour of Ann Loades".

Selected works

References

1938 births
2022 deaths
British Christian theologians
20th-century British theologians
21st-century British theologians
Proponents of Christian feminism
Feminist theologians
Academics of Durham University
Alumni of St Mary's College, Durham